The bentbills  are found in the genus Oncostoma in the tyrant flycatcher family Tyrannidae. It contains the following two species:

References

 
Bird genera
 
Taxa named by Philip Sclater
Taxonomy articles created by Polbot